is a railway station in the city of Kurihara, Miyagi Prefecture, Japan, operated by East Japan Railway Company (JR East).

Lines
Arikabe Station is served by the Tōhoku Main Line, and is located 437.8 rail kilometers from the terminus of the line at Tokyo Station.

Station layout
Arikabe Station has two opposed side platforms connected to the station building by a footbridge.  The station is unattended.

Platforms

History
Arikabe Station opened on October 16, 1924. The station was absorbed into the JR East network upon the privatization of the Japanese National Railways (JNR) on April 1, 1987.

See also
 List of Railway Stations in Japan

External links

  

Railway stations in Miyagi Prefecture
Tōhoku Main Line
Railway stations in Japan opened in 1924
Kurihara, Miyagi
Stations of East Japan Railway Company